Julien Tadrowski (born 17 May 1993 in Roncq) is a footballer who plays as a defender for Legia Warsaw II. Born in France, he represented Poland at youth international levels and has spent most of his career with Polish clubs.

Career

Club
He played for 10 years with the various academy teams at Lille OSC. In July 2012, he signed a two-year contract with Arka Gdynia. He then joined Pogoń Szczecin, signing a three-year contract.

National team
He was a part of the Poland national under-21 football team.

References

External links
 

1993 births
Living people
People from Roncq
Sportspeople from Nord (French department)
Footballers from Hauts-de-France
French people of Polish descent
Association football defenders
Polish footballers
French footballers
Poland youth international footballers
Poland under-21 international footballers
Arka Gdynia players
Pogoń Szczecin players
Górnik Łęczna players
Ząbkovia Ząbki players
Widzew Łódź players
Lille OSC players
Motor Lublin players
Stal Rzeszów players
MKP Pogoń Siedlce players
KS Lublinianka players
Legia Warsaw II players
Ekstraklasa players
I liga players
II liga players
III liga players
IV liga players